Leela is a board game with origins in ancient India.  The original game was created by Hindu scholars with the intention of teaching moral values, and was a precursor to the modern  game snakes and ladders.

Details
The game was designed over five thousand years ago. It is a game of life which provides insight into human consciousness and a key to divine knowledge. One or more are able to play Leela by using the game board and book, a die, and a significant item that belongs to the player. One example of an item that can be used is a ring. This item serves as the player's symbol during the game.

See also
 Gyan chauper
 Snakes and Ladders

References

History of board games